Henri Moreau (15 July 17283 November 1803) was a Belgian composer and teacher born in Liège in what is now modern-day Belgium. He studied with Bartolomeo Lustrini and Antonio Aurisicchio and he is known to have taught André Ernest Modeste Grétry. Moreau composed religious works which were never printed but would have included Christmas carols popular at the time in Liège. Moreau wrote a number of instrumental works, for example 6 trios, which are known to have been written in Liège around 1777 but were subsequently lost.

Works
 Te Deum
Sonatas: 2 violins-double bass (1777)

References

1728 births
1803 deaths
Belgian composers
Belgian male classical composers
Belgian Baroque composers